Tuchořice is a municipality and village in Louny District in the Ústí nad Labem Region of the Czech Republic. It has about 700 inhabitants.

Administrative parts

Villages of Nečemice and Třeskonice are administrative parts of Tuchořice.

Paleontology
Tuchořice is a paleontological site with Miocene lacustrine limestone deposits. Some 90 species of molluscs were found in this site. The majority of those species are land snails and some of them were originally described from Tuchořice.

References

Villages in Louny District